Legacy of the Green Ninja is the second season of the computer-animated television series Ninjago: Masters of Spinjitzu (titled Ninjago from the eleventh season onward). The series was created by Michael Hegner and Tommy Andreasen. The season aired from 18 July to 21 November 2012, following the first season titled Rise of the Snakes. It is succeeded by the third season, titled Rebooted.

The second season was originally intended as the final season of the series. The show and its associated Lego Ninjago product line had been planned as a three-year project. However, due to the strong performance of the television series and the product line combined with positive feedback from online forums, the series was continued past the end of 2013.

Legacy of the Green Ninja follows the storyline of the ninja training their new team member Lloyd Garmadon in order to prepare for a prophesied battle. Lord Garmadon returns as an antagonist whose devious plans result in Lloyd being magically aged up to a teenager. The season also introduces Lloyd's mother Misako for the first time. It also reveals the Overlord as the main season antagonist and culminates in the final battle.

Voice cast

Main 
 Jillian Michaels as Lloyd Garmadon, the Green Ninja
 Vincent Tong as Kai, the red ninja and Elemental Master of Fire
 Michael Adamthwaite as Jay, the blue ninja and Elemental Master of Lightning
 Brent Miller as Zane, the white ninja and Elemental Master of Ice
 Kirby Morrow as Cole, the black ninja and Elemental Master of Earth
 Kelly Metzger as Nya, Kai's sister
 Paul Dobson as Sensei Wu, the wise teacher of the ninja
 Mark Oliver as Lord Garmadon
 Kathleen Barr as Misako
Scott McNeil as the Overlord/Dragon Overlord

Supporting 

 Alan Marriott as Captain Soto
 Alan Marriott as Dareth
 Paul Dobson as General Kozu
Colin Murdock as Ed
Jillian Michaels as Edna
Kirby Morrow as Lou
Mark Oliver as Dr. Julien
Ian James Corlett as Skales
Brian Drummond as Nuckal/Kruncha
Andrew Francis as Lloyd (Older)
Michael Kopsa as Samukai
Kelly Sheridan as Gayle Gossip
 Mackenzie Gray as Fangpyre General/Museum Curator/Mystake
 John Novak as Constrictai General
 Paul Dobson as Venomari General/Mother Doomsday/Garmatron
 Cathy Weseluck as Patty Keys
 Kathleen Barr as Brad

Production

Direction 
The Legacy of the Green Ninja episodes were directed by Martin Skov, Michael Helmuth Hansen, Peter Hausner, Trylle Vilstrup and Thomas Østergaard Poulsen.

Animation 
The animation for the second season was produced at Wil Film ApS in Denmark.

Release 
The first episode of the season titled Darkness Shall Rise was released on 18 July 2012 on Cartoon Network. The subsequent episodes were released in July, August, October and November 2012. The season finale titled Rise of the Spinjitzu Master was released on 21 November 2012.

Plot 
The ninja begin training Lloyd so that he can face his father in battle. Meanwhile, Garmadon recruits the Serpentine, rebuilds the Destiny's Bounty as the Black Bounty and merges the Golden Weapons into the powerful Mega Weapon. Garmadon resurrects the original crew of the Destiny's Bounty, led by Captain Soto. They pilot the ship to Ninjago City, but the ninja engage them in battle. Eventually, Garmadon escapes with the Bounty. Garmadon creates clones of the ninja as a way to defeat them. When the ninja visit Darkley's School, they are locked in a room by the students and forced to defeat the clones. They decide to enter a road race named the Ninjaball Run to earn the grand prize so that they can save Dareth's Mojo Dojo. Garmadon decides to participate to stop the ninja from winning. After fighting for lead position, the ninja narrowly win the race and Lloyd takes possession of the Bounty.

At Ninjago Museum of History, Garmadon uses the Mega Weapon to resurrect the extinct Grundal to destroy the ninja. When the ninja burst in, they are struck by the weapon and transformed into children. They are later forced to defend themselves from the Grundal in the comic book store, but Master Wu and Nya arrive and Lloyd uses Tomorrow's Tea to turn the Grundal back into bones. The ninja are transformed back to their present ages, but Lloyd is rapidly aged up to an adolescent. Garmadon attempts to change the past by stopping the ninja team from forming, so the original four ninja follow him into a time portal to the temporal point when Wu first recruited Kai. They manage to restore the timeline by using the Golden Weapons of the past to blast the Mega Weapon into space. At Ninjago Museum, Lloyd is reunited with his mother, Misako.

After being betrayed by Skales, Garmadon finds himself on the Dark Island with the disembodied voice of the Overlord. The venom of the Great Devourer seeps into catacombs beneath Ninjago and animates a Stone Army, which wreaks havoc on Ninjago City. Garmadon takes control of the Stone Army using the Helmet of Shadows. The Ninjas, Lloyd, Sensei Wu and Misako journey to the Dark Island to find a 'Temple of Light' that can restore the Ninjas' elemental powers but are attacked by Starteeth (barnacle-like star fish) that start eating through their ship.   The ninja travel to the Dark Island to stop Garmadon and reach the Temple of Light to harness their elemental powers and bestow Golden Power on Lloyd. They fail to stop the Celestial Clock from counting down to the final battle. Garmadon's super weapon, Garmatron, is used to fire dark matter into Ninjago. The Overlord is revealed to be the dark lord from the prophecy. He possesses Garmadon and heads to Ninjago with his army. The ninja return to Ninjago on Ultra Dragon and are forced to defend Lloyd while being hit by dark matter, leaving Lloyd to confront the Overlord alone. The Overlord transforms into a massive dragon, but Lloyd uses his Golden Power to destroy the Overlord in an explosion of light, which purges Garmadon of evil and transforms Lloyd into the Golden Ninja.

Episodes

Ratings 
The Season 2 premiere was listed as the top telecast of the day with children aged 2–11 and all boys on Wednesday 18 July 2012 and secured more than 2.8 million total viewers aged 2+. It was the top telecast in its Wednesday, 8 p.m. time period with children aged 6–11 and 9-14 and all boys. The series led Cartoon Network to the number one television network position on Wednesday nights with children aged 2–11 and all boys. The season premiere increased average ratings by double and triple digits compared to its original Season 1 premiere for the same time period (ranging between 124% and 184%), the previous four weeks (between 114% and 154%) and all competitive programming including Disney Channel and Nickelodeon in the same time period (between 14% and 506%) The total number of viewers aged 2+ increased by 30%.

See also 

 List of Ninjago characters

References

Primary

Secondary 

Legacy of the Green Ninja
2012 Canadian television seasons
2012 Danish television seasons